is an exclave village that belongs to Higashimuro District, Wakayama Prefecture, Japan, but is located on the border between Mie and Nara Prefectures. It lies along the Kitayama River and has become a popular spot for log rafting.

As of 2016, the village has an estimated population of 432 and a density of 9 persons per km². The total area is 48.21 km².

Kitayama is the only remaining village in Wakayama Prefecture. Kitayama is known in Japan for growing a fruit called jabara, which is considered a potent cure for hay fever.

History 
Kitayama has a long history associated with logging, cutting trees and sending the timber to be sold in nearby Shingū. When the transition from the Edo period to the modern era of prefectures occurred, the people of Kitayama desired to remain a part of Wakayama prefecture due to their close connections with Shingu City, and as a result this request was granted and for this reason the village is now an exclave. In 2005, there were plans for the village to merge with Shingu but this was canceled.

Transportation

Highway 

 Japan National Route 169

See also
 List of enclaves and exclaves

References

External links 

  

Enclaves and exclaves
Villages in Wakayama Prefecture